3-Way Tie (For Last) is the fourth and final full-length album recorded by the American punk band Minutemen.  It is particularly notable for featuring several covers of songs by bands such as the Urinals, Meat Puppets, Blue Öyster Cult, Creedence Clearwater Revival, and Roky Erickson. The last song, a cover of Erickson's "Bermuda," was sung over the phone by Mike Watt.

The album was released very shortly before the death of D. Boon, who also painted the cover. Watt collaborated with Black Flag bassist Kira Roessler on four tracks ("Political Nightmare", "No One", "Stories", and "What Is It?"). Around the time that the album was recorded, Watt and Roessler formed Dos.

The album included ballots for listeners to vote on the track list for what would become Ballot Result.

Track listing
Side D.
"Price of Paradise" (Boon) - 3:38
"Lost" (Curt Kirkwood) - 2:33
"The Big Stick" (Boon) - 2:34
"Political Nightmare" (Roessler, Watt) - 3:56
"Courage" (Boon) - 2:35
"Have You Ever Seen the Rain?" (John Fogerty) - 2:30

Side Mike
"The Red and the Black" (Bloom, Bouchard, Pearlman) - 4:09
"Spoken Word Piece" (Watt) - 1:07
"No One" (Kira Roessler, Watt) - 3:29
"Stories" (Roessler, Watt) - 1:36
"What Is It?" (Roessler, Watt) - 1:51
"Ack Ack Ack" (Johansen, Jones, Talley) - 0:27
"Just Another Soldier" (Boon) - 1:58
"Situations at Hand" (Watt) - 1:23
"Hittin' the Bong" (Watt) - 0:41
"Bermuda" (Roky Erickson) - 1:41

Personnel
Minutemen
D. Boon – electric guitar, acoustic guitar, vocals, piano
Mike Watt – bass, vocals, acoustic guitar, electric guitar
George Hurley – drums
with:
Joe Baiza – guitar ("Situations At Hand")
Ethan James – Linn drum ("What Is It?"), Vietnam War battlefield tape ("Spoken Word Piece")

Charts

References 

Minutemen (band) albums
1985 albums
SST Records albums